Luciano Williames Dias (born 25 July 1970) is a Brazilian football coach and former player. He is currently an assistant coach at Corinthians.

Playing career
In his playing days he was a defender for Grêmio, Standard Liège, Corinthians, Fluminense and Mamoré.

Luciano was a player on Luiz Felipe Scolari's Grêmio team who won the 1995 Copa Libertadores. After being sold in 1997, he made 18 Belgian First Division A appearances for Standard Liège, weighing in with four goals.

References

External links
 

1970 births
Living people
Footballers from Porto Alegre
Brazilian footballers
Brazilian football managers
Association football defenders
Campeonato Brasileiro Série A players
Belgian Pro League players
Campeonato Brasileiro Série C managers
Brazilian expatriate footballers
Expatriate footballers in Belgium
Grêmio Foot-Ball Porto Alegrense players
Sport Club Corinthians Paulista players
Standard Liège players
Fluminense FC players
Esporte Clube Mamoré players
Sport Club Corinthians Alagoano managers
Clube Esportivo Bento Gonçalves managers
Rio Preto Esporte Clube managers
Botafogo Futebol Clube (SP) managers
Guarani FC managers
Oeste Futebol Clube managers
São Bernardo Futebol Clube managers
Esporte Clube Noroeste managers
Red Bull Brasil managers
Cuiabá Esporte Clube managers
Grêmio Esportivo Catanduvense managers
Clube Atlético Penapolense managers
Esporte Clube Santo André managers
Club Sportivo Sergipe managers
Comercial Futebol Clube (Ribeirão Preto) managers
Atlético Monte Azul managers